Mikolajczak or Mikołajczak is a surname. Notable people with the surname include:

Christian Mikolajczak (born 1981), German footballer
Detlef Mikolajczak (born 1964), German footballer
Martyna Mikołajczak (born 1991), Polish rower
Tomasz Mikołajczak (born 1987), Polish footballer